Sisters is a 2006 independent horror film directed by Douglas Buck. A remake of the 1972 Brian De Palma film of the same name, it stars Stephen Rea, Lou Doillon, and Chloë Sevigny in the leading roles, with Dallas Roberts and JR Bourne playing supporting characters.

Premise
The story centers on a news reporter (Sevigny) who, after witnessing a murder, becomes involved in a crime investigation surrounding a mysterious doctor (Rea) and one of his former patients, a young French woman who was born with a Conjoined twin.

Cast
 Stephen Rea as Dr. Philip Lacan
 Lou Doillon as Angelique/Annabel Tristiana
 Chloë Sevigny as Grace Collier
 Dallas Roberts as Dylan Wallace
 JR Bourne as Larry Franklin
 William B. Davis as Dr. Bryant
 Gabrielle Rose as Dr. Mercedes Kent
 Talia Williams as Lily
 Rachel Williams as Eve
 Erica Van Briel as Sofia Tristiana

Production
During a screening of New Rose Hotel at the 1998 Venice Film Festival, producer Edward R. Pressman announced his intention to remake Sisters. Pressman said of the project: 
There’s obviously been a post-Scream reaction in Hollywood to the horror film. Scream regenerated the form commercially, and whenever a film does that well it tends to create a gold rush. That’s why we’re seeing all these Alfred Hitchcock remakes at the moment like A Perfect Murder, Rear Window and Psycho. So why not remake a Hitchcock knock-off. which was what SISTERS was always being called.

The film was filmed in 2006 in North Carolina as well as Vancouver, British Columbia on an estimated budget of $5,000,000. It had a troubled release history, and was never given a theatrical release; it was eventually released on DVD in the United States on March 11, 2008.

References

External links
 
 

2006 films
2006 horror films
Remakes of American films
American independent films
Horror film remakes
Films shot in North Carolina
Films shot in Vancouver
2000s English-language films
2000s American films